John and Chauncey White House, also known as the John White Homestead, is a historic home and national historic district located near West Sweden, Monroe County, New York. It was built about 1851, and is a -story, "L"-shaped, Italianate style brick dwelling with a cross-gable roof. The house was doubled in size about 1880.  It features a one-story, full width Colonial Revival porch added about 1900. Also on the property are the contributing barn (c. 1830, 1903), stone smokehouse (c. 1840), milk house and ice house (c. 1890), and a garage (c. 1915).

It was listed on the National Register of Historic Places in 2013.

References

Historic districts on the National Register of Historic Places in New York (state)
Houses on the National Register of Historic Places in New York (state)
Italianate architecture in New York (state)
Colonial Revival architecture in New York (state)
Houses completed in 1851
Buildings and structures in Monroe County, New York
National Register of Historic Places in Monroe County, New York